Lil' Mo' Yin Yang is a collaborative house-music act of producers and DJs Erick Morillo and Masters at Work's Little Louie Vega. Their only song, "Reach," released in 1995 on Strictly Rhythm records, hit #1 on the Hot Dance Music/Club Play chart at the end of the year.

See also
List of Billboard number-one dance club songs
List of artists who reached number one on the U.S. Dance Club Songs chart

References

American house music groups
American dance music groups
American electronic music groups